The Naked Cage is a 1986 American drama thriller film written and directed by Paul Nicholas. The film stars Shari Shattuck, Angel Tompkins, Lucinda Crosby, Stacey Shaffer, Christina Whitaker and Nick Benedict. The film was released on March 7, 1986, by Cannon Film Distributors.

Plot 
Michelle, a young woman falsely convicted of a bank robbery, is sent to a prison run by Diane, a corrupt warden. She struggles to survive the harsh prison life, where violent bullying, sexual assault and drug addiction run rampant.

Cast 
 Shari Shattuck as Michelle
 Angel Tompkins as Diane
 Lucinda Crosby as Rhonda
 Stacey Shaffer as Amy
 Christina Whitaker as Rita
 Nick Benedict as Smiley
 John Terlesky as Willy
 Faith Minton as Sheila
 Aude Charles as Brenda
 Angela Elayne Gibbs as Vonna 
 Carole Ita White as 'Trouble'
 Lisa London as Abbey
 Leslie Scarborough as 'Peaches'
 Valerie McIntosh as Ruby
 Larry Gelman as Doc
 Suzy London as Martha
 Flo Lawrence as Mother 
 James Ingersoll as Father
 Seth Kaufman as Randy
 William Bassett as Jordan
 Nora Niesen as 'Bigfoot'
 Jennifer Anne Thomas as Mock
 Chris Anders as Miller
 Al Jones as The Bartender 	
 Sheila MacRae as Bank Teller 
 Bob Saurman as Motorcycle Cop
 Rick Avery as Security Officer
 Christopher Doyle as Police Officer
 Gretchen Davis as Prison Guard
 Beryl Jones as Prison Guard
 Michael Kerr as Prison Guard

Home Video 
Scream Factory released the film on Blu-ray on May 2, 2017.

References

External links 
 
 

1986 films
American thriller drama films
1986 drama films
Golan-Globus films
Women in prison films
1980s English-language films
1980s American films